Inscape is a provider of ACR services to Smart TV OEMs. The company was founded in 2009 as TV Interactive Systems later renamed Cognitive Media Networks Inc. On August 10, 2015, Vizio acquired Cognitive Media Networks and renamed it Inscape. In July 2016 Vizio announced Inscape will spin off and operate as a separate, privately owned company.

History
Inscape was founded in 2009 by Zeev Neumeier as TV Interactive Systems. 
In 2012 the company raised $2.5 million in funding from Rogers Venture Partners, rebranded as Cognitive Networks, and hired Michael Collette as its CEO.
On August 28, 2013, LG announced its LivePlus interactive service powered by Cognitive Network ACR. LG subsequently partnered with Showtime Network to launch in-program interactivity using Cognitive Network ACR.
On August 10, 2015, Vizio acquired Cognitive Networks and renamed it Inscape
In July 2016 Vizio announced Inscape will spin off and operate as a separate, privately owned company with past Vizio CEO William Wang as new CEO.

On November 9, 2015, privacy advocate Julia Angwin exposed the Inscape technology within Vizio televisions in an investigative piece for Pro Publica.

Technology journals like Ars Technica investigated the matter and found that not only was Vizio observing its customers viewing behavior, it was quite easy for its software to be hacked and observed by third parties. Shortly after these reports, both Vizio and its subsidiary Inscape Data Services were named in numerous class action lawsuits for violation of the Video Privacy Protection Act.

References

Companies based in San Francisco